Day to Praise is a global interfaith praise initiative set forth by CJCUC Chancellor & Founder, Rabbi Shlomo Riskin and CJCUC Executive Director, David Nekrutman. The initiative takes to form in an annual event on Yom Ha'atzmaut (Israel's Independence Day) in which Christians worldwide are called on and invited by Rabbi Riskin to recite Hallel (Psalms 113–118) with the Jewish People in a celebration to praise God for the State of Israel.

Background
Hallel consists of six Psalms (113–118), which are recited as a unit, on joyous occasions. These occasions include the following: The three pilgrim festivals Passover, Shavuot, and Sukkot (the "bigger" Jewish holy days, mentioned in the Torah) and Hanukkah and Rosh Chodesh (beginnings of the new month).
Two years after the establishment of the State of Israel in 1948, the Chief Rabbinate in Israel decided that Yom Ha'atzmaut should be given the status of a minor Jewish holiday on which Hallel (Psalms 113–118) be recited. The recitation of the blessing over Hallel was introduced in 1973 by Israeli Chief Rabbi Shlomo Goren.

History

Conception 
In October 2014, Rabbi Shlomo Riskin, the Chancellor & Founder of the Center for Jewish-Christian Understanding and Cooperation (CJCUC), became the first Orthodox rabbi to invite Christian visitors to Israel to participate in a "praise rally" with Jewish interfaith leaders at the center's headquarters during the holiday of Sukkot during which Hallel was recited. This celebratory event would serve as the basis for the eventual conception of the global Day to Praise initiative.

In 2015 

The Day to Praise Global initiative was launched in March 2015. In an email sent out to Israel supporters worldwide Rabbi Riskin wrote:

As part of the praise worship celebrations, Day to Praise produced songs, inspired by the Hallel Psalms. A portion of the proceeds from these songs go to supporting Heart to Heart, a virtual blood donation program in Israel.

The initiative caused an uproar within the Haredi Jewish circles. In a statement, the once chief Sephardi Rabbi of Israel, and the chief Rabbi of Jerusalem, Rabbi Shlomo Amar, expressed his "stomach churning" in light of the joint Hallel prayer of Jews and Christians in a synagogue in Jerusalem being led by Rabbi Shlomo Riskin. In a rebuttal, Rabbi Riskin defended his actions stating, "We are talking about a thanksgiving prayer to G-d that would include Christians who worship His actions towards the Jewish people and the Land of Israel ... What could possibly be more appropriate?". Later that year, in September, on the eve of Rosh HaShana (the beginning of the Jewish New Year), Riskin's claim was given further backing by Rabbi Pesach Wolicki. In an article written for The Times of Israel, Wolicki wrote, "While discomfort is understandable, we dare not assume that what is uncomfortable and new is therefore forbidden."

The first annual Day to Praise took place on 23 April 2015 with the central event taking place at HaZvi Israel Synagogue in Jerusalem. The central Day to Praise event was reportedly joined by tens of thousands of worshipers throughout the world, in their own respective groups.

Later that year, in 2015, during the festival of Sukkot, CJCUC, together with its founder, Rabbi Shlomo Riskin, the chief rabbi of Efrat, hosted an interfaith event in Efrat in which 200 Christians and Jews came together to sing the praises of God in unity. Riskin said that the event would help usher in the Messianic Age.

In 2016
The second annual Day to Praise took place on 12 May 2016 and the central event was held in Gush Etzion, the scene of many past terror attacks. The event consisted of 120 representatives of the Jewish and Christian faiths. The representatives were groups from Israel, The United States, Germany and Brazil and international interfaith organizations such as "Bridges for Peace" and "Christian Friends of Israel".

During the event, each of the participants read Psalm 117 in their native language, and then read it together in Hebrew. According to co-founder David Nekrutman, this in-gathering was the fulfilment of the biblical prophecy of Zephaniah: "For then will I turn to the peoples a pure language that they may all call upon the name of the LORD to serve Him with one consent."

In 2017
The third annual Day to Praise took place on 2 May 2017 and the central event was held in Jerusalem. As per tradition, the Jewish and Christian attendees celebrated by reciting the Psalms 113–118 reportedly joined by hundreds more from around the world. Event co-founder, David Nekrutman, stated that one of the main themes at this year's event was seeing "the importance of looking at one another and walking together" within the Psalms themselves. This year's event also marked the golden jubilee of the reunification of Jerusalem. A week before celebrations began, a Day to Praise Hallel service was held in Germany by a group of 125 Christians. It was also reported that a few days later, the synagogue in Youngstown, Ohio invited Christians to join them for a Hallel service.

In 2018

The fourth annual Day to Praise took place on 19 April 2018. The central event was held on the eve of 18 April and began with a Memorial Day ceremony for Israel's fallen soldiers. Jews and Christians joined together in an event which "took them from the depths of sadness over Israel’s losses in wars for survival, to the heights of joy on Israel’s 70th anniversary". This year's central event was held at the John Hagee Center for Jewish Heritage at the Netanya Academic College where reportedly around 350 Jews and Christians were in attendance. As with every Day to Praise event, attendees recited the Psalms of Praise. Associate director of CJCUC, Rabbi Pesach Wolicki, stated that Christians praising God and praying for Israel is "an essential piece of the prophetic puzzle" and that without them the prophecies about Israel's future geula (redemption) would not be complete.

References

External links 

 

International observances
Hallel
Worship
Christian Zionism
Christian and Jewish interfaith dialogue
Iyar observances
Annual events in Israel
Christianity in Israel